Octávio Figueira Trompowsky de Almeida (30 November 1897 – 26 March 1984) was a Brazilian chess player, who was born and died in Rio de Janeiro.
Trompowsky won the 1939 Brazilian Championship, but is best known as the player for whom the Trompowsky Attack (1.d4 Nf6 2.Bg5) chess opening was named.

References

Further reading

External links 

1897 births
1984 deaths
Brazilian chess players
Chess theoreticians
Chess Olympiad competitors
Brazilian people of Polish descent
20th-century chess players